The Tikriwal or Tekriwal is actually a geographical name for the sub-tribes of the valley of "Tikrai" of Swati origins, is situated in the present day Batagram District at the eastern slope of the famous Black Mountain i.e. Tor Ghar or Kala Dhaka, Pakistan.

References

Pashto-language surnames
Pakistani names
Social groups of Rajasthan
Social groups of Gujarat
Weaving communities of South Asia